Ouseburn Viaduct carries the East Coast Main Line over the Ouseburn Valley through the East End of Newcastle-upon-Tyne. Designed by architects John and Benjamin Green, it was originally built in the late 1830s for the Newcastle and North Shields Railway. It is a Grade II* listed building.

When originally built the viaducts were made of laminated timber construction on the Wiebeking system, whereby each arch was made from multiple layers of timbers held together by trenails and 
supported on stone pillars.

The viaduct was rebuilt in iron between 1867 and 1869 by the Weardale Iron & Coal Company to the designs of engineer Thomas Elliot Harrison for the North Eastern Railway Company, doubling its width to accommodate four tracks but preserving the bridge's original appearance. It now carries the East Coast Main Line.

It is one of three high level bridges in close proximity making the same crossing, with the Byker Viaduct carrying the Tyne and Wear Metro and then the Byker road bridge both to the south.

See also
Willington Dene Viaduct

References

Railway bridges in Tyne and Wear
Grade II* listed buildings in Tyne and Wear
Buildings and structures in Newcastle upon Tyne
John and Benjamin Green buildings and structures
Grade II* listed railway bridges and viaducts